Ayatollah Gholamreza Rezvani (September 24, 1922 – April 19, 2013) was a member of the Council of Guardians in the Islamic Republic of Iran.  He believed in literal interpretation of Quran, hadith, and sunnah and has argued that there is "no substitute" for stoning adulterers.

References and notes

See also
 Iranian Criminal Code
 List of Ayatollahs
List of members in the First Term of the Council of Experts
List of members in the Second Term of the Council of Experts
List of members in the Third Term of the Council of Experts

Iranian ayatollahs
2013 deaths
Members of the Guardian Council
Members of the Assembly of Experts
1922 births